The following highways are numbered 20C:

United States
  Nebraska Highway 20C (former)

See also
 List of highways numbered 20